Frank Calhoun Potts (January 15, 1903 – May 26, 1990) was an American college football player, track and field athlete, and coach of American football, cross country, and track. He served as the head cross country and track coach at of the University of Colorado at Boulder from 1927 to 1968. Potts also coached the Colorado Buffaloes football team in 1940, 1944, and 1945, compiling a record of 16–8–1.

A native of Ada, Oklahoma, Potts attended the University of Oklahoma, where he played college football as a halfback and competed in track as a pole vaulter. He was captain of the track team in 1927. After graduating from Oklahoma in 1927, Potts went to Colorado as head track coach and assistant football coach.

Potts died on May 26, 1990, at Boulder Manor Heather Care Center in Boulder, Colorado.

Head coaching record

Football

See also
 List of college football head coaches with non-consecutive tenure

References

External links
 University of Colorado Athletic Hall of Fame profile

1903 births
1990 deaths
American football halfbacks
American male pole vaulters
Colorado Buffaloes football coaches
Oklahoma Sooners football players
Oklahoma Sooners men's track and field athletes
College track and field coaches in the United States
People from Ada, Oklahoma
People from Sulphur, Oklahoma
Coaches of American football from Oklahoma
Players of American football from Oklahoma
Track and field athletes from Oklahoma